James Hawkins Peck (January 12, 1790 – April 29, 1836) was a United States district judge of the United States District Court for the District of Missouri.

Education and career

Born on January 12, 1790, in Mossy Creek (now Jefferson City), North Carolina (Southwest Territory from May 26, 1790, State of Tennessee from June 1, 1796), Peck served in the United States Army starting in 1812, during the War of 1812. He entered private practice in Tennessee until 1818. He continued private practice in St. Louis, Missouri Territory (State of Missouri from August 10, 1821) from 1818 to 1822.

Federal judicial service

Peck was nominated by President James Monroe on March 26, 1822, to the United States District Court for the District of Missouri, to a new seat authorized by 3 Stat. 653. He was confirmed by the United States Senate on April 5, 1822, and received his commission the same day. His service terminated on April 29, 1836, due to his death in St. Charles, Missouri.

Allegations of abuse of power, impeachment and acquittal

Peck was involved in several land claim cases arising out of the Louisiana territory purchase; in one such case in 1825 he ruled against the client of the lawyer Luke Lawless and published his opinion in a St. Louis newspaper the following year. In response, Lawless posted an anonymous letter rebutting Peck's ruling in another newspaper. The authorship of the letter soon became known and Peck found Lawless in contempt of Court for:

Intent to impair the public confidence in the upright intentions of said court, and to bring odium upon the court, and especially with intent to impress the public mind, and particularly many litigants in this court, that they are not to expect justice in the cases now pending therein.

Peck had Lawless placed in jail for 24 hours and removed his right to practice in a federal court for 18 months. Lawless began a crusade against Peck, which included submitting his own memorial for impeachment to the House. This memorial resulted in Impeachment charges before the U.S. House of Representatives.

Peck was impeached by the United States House of Representatives on April 24, 1830, on a charge of abuse of the contempt power. The United States Senate began his impeachment trial on April 26, 1830, and acquitted him on January 31, 1831, with 21 voting guilty and 22 voting not guilty.

References

Sources
 
 
 

1790 births
1836 deaths
19th-century American judges
19th-century American politicians
Impeached United States federal judges
Judges of the United States District Court for the District of Missouri
Lawyers from St. Louis
People from Jefferson County, Tennessee
People from Tennessee in the War of 1812
United States Army personnel
United States federal judges appointed by James Monroe